HSwMS Claes Uggla was a torpedo cruiser of the Swedish Navy. She was named after the 17th-century admiral Claes Uggla. The ship's name is spelled as Clas Uggla in some English-language sources.

Claes Uggla ran aground and sank on 22 June 1917.

External links
Photo of wreck

Örnen-class cruisers
Ships built in Stockholm
1899 ships
Maritime incidents in 1917
Shipwrecks in the Baltic Sea
Shipwrecks of Sweden